Boubacar Dembélé (born March 1, 1982) is a French footballer who plays for Romorantin. He also holds Malian citizenship.

External links
Guardian Football

1982 births
Living people
French footballers
AS Beauvais Oise players
K.S.V. Roeselare players
FC Martigues players
ÉFC Fréjus Saint-Raphaël players
SO Romorantin players
Belgian Pro League players
Championnat National players
French sportspeople of Malian descent
French expatriate footballers
Expatriate footballers in Belgium
French expatriate sportspeople in Belgium
Association football midfielders
Black French sportspeople